The 52nd Golden Horse Awards (Mandarin： 第52屆金馬獎) honored the best Chinese-language films and filmmakers of 2014–15 and took place on 21 November 2015 at Sun Yat-sen Memorial Hall in Taipei, Taiwan. The ceremony presented 23 categories of Golden Horse Awards and was televised in Taiwan by TTV. Mickey Huang and Lin Chi-ling were the hosts of the ceremony.

Winners and nominees 
Winners are listed first, highlighted in boldface.

References

External links
 Official website of the Golden Horse Awards

52nd
2015 film awards
2015 in Taiwan